The following outline is provided as an overview of and topical guide to Bangladesh:

Bangladesh – sovereign country located in South Asia. It is bordered by India on all sides except for a small border with Burma to the far southeast and by the Bay of Bengal to the south. Together with the Indian state of West Bengal, it makes up the ethno-linguistic region of Bengal. The name Bangladesh means "The land of Bengal" in the official Bengali language. Bangladesh became an independent sovereign nation in 1971 after a bloody struggle for liberation from Pakistan led by Sheikh Mujibur Rahman and General M. A. G. Osmani. Bangladesh is the eight-most populous country and the fifth-most populous democracy in the world. Furthermore, Bangladesh inherited the borders drawn by Cyril Radcliffe, 1st Viscount Radcliffe during Partition.

General reference 
 Pronunciation: , 
 Common English country name:  Bangladesh
 Official English country name: People's Republic of Bangladesh
 Common endonym: Bangladesh
 Official endonym: Bangladesh
 Adjectival: Bangladeshi (official), Bengali (colloquial) 
 Demonym: Bangladeshis (official), Bengalis (colloquial)
 ISO Country codes: BD, BGD, 050
 ISO Region codes: See ISO 3166-2:BD
 Internet country code top-level domain: .bd, .বাংলা
 International rankings of Bangladesh

Geography of Bangladesh 

Geography of Bangladesh
 Bangladesh is: a country
 Location:
 Northern Hemisphere and Eastern Hemisphere
 Eurasia
 Asia
 South Asia
 Indian subcontinent
  Greater Bangladesh
 Time zone:  Bangladesh Standard Time (UTC+06), Bangladesh Daylight Saving Time (UTC+07)
 Extreme points of Bangladesh
 High:  Saka Haphong 
 Low:  Bay of Bengal 0 m
 Land boundaries:  4,246 km
 Republic of India 4,053 km
 193 km
 Coastline:  580 km      
 Bay of Bengal
 Population of Bangladesh: 162,221,000 (2009) – 8th most populous country
 Area of Bangladesh:  – 94th largest country
 Atlas of Bangladesh

Environment of Bangladesh 

 Climate of Bangladesh
 Renewable energy in Bangladesh
 Geology of Bangladesh
 Protected areas of Bangladesh
 National parks of Bangladesh
 Wildlife of Bangladesh
 Fauna of Bangladesh
 Birds of Bangladesh
 Mammals of Bangladesh
 Bengal tiger
 Reptiles of Bangladesh
 Bengal monitor

Natural geographic features of Bangladesh 

 Beaches in Bangladesh
 Cox's Bazar
 Kuakata
 Patenga
 Islands of Bangladesh
 Mountains of Bangladesh
 Keokradong
 Rivers of Bangladesh
 List of World Heritage Sites in Bangladesh

Ecoregions of Bangladesh

Administrative divisions of Bangladesh 

Administrative divisions of Bangladesh
 Divisions of Bangladesh
 Districts of Bangladesh
 Upazilas of Bangladesh

Divisions of Bangladesh 

Divisions of Bangladesh
 Barisal
 Chittagong
 Dhaka
 Khulna
 Mymensingh
 Rajshahi
Rangpur
 Sylhet

Districts of Bangladesh 

Districts of Bangladesh
Barisal
 Barguna
 Barisal
 Bhola
 Jhalokati
 Patuakhali
 Pirojpur

Chittagong
 Bandarban
 Brahmanbaria
 Chandpur
 Chittagong
 Comilla
 Cox's Bazar
 Feni
 Khagrachari
 Lakshmipur
 Noakhali
 Rangamati

Dhaka
 Dhaka
 Faridpur
 Gazipur
 Gopalganj
 Kishoreganj
 Madaripur
 Manikganj
 Munshiganj
 Narayanganj
 Narsingdi
 Rajbari
 Shariatpur
 Tangail

Khulna
 Bagerhat
 Chuadanga
 Jessore
 Jhenaidah
 Khulna
 Kushtia
 Magura
 Meherpur
 Narail
 Satkhira

Mymensingh
 Jamalpur
 Mymensingh
 Netrakona
 Sherpur

Rajshahi
 Bogra
 Jaipurhat
 Naogaon
 Natore
 Nawabganj
 Pabna
 Rajshahi
 Sirajganj

Rangpur
 Dinajpur
 Gaibandha
 Kurigram
 Lalmonirhat
 Nilphamari
 Panchagarh
 Rangpur
 Thakurgaon

Sylhet
 Habiganj
 Maulvibazar
 Sunamganj
 Sylhet

Subdistricts of Bangladesh 

Upazilas of Bangladesh
The districts are subdivided into 493 sub-districts, or upazila.

Cities of Bangladesh 
 Major cities of Bangladesh
 Dhaka – capital city and the political, economic and cultural heart of Bangladesh. Dhaka is the most populous city in Bangladesh and the tenth-largest city in the world, with a population of over 15 million inhabitants.
 Chittagong – second most populous city and main seaport of Bangladesh. It is a major commercial, financial and industrial hub. Located on the Karnaphuli River, it is the administrative seat of Chittagong District and Chittagong Division (the largest division of Bangladesh). The metropolitan area has a population of 4 million residents.
 Khulna – third-largest city in Bangladesh, with a population of more than 1.4 million people. Khulna is also the third largest economic centre in Bangladesh. The major sectors are jute, chemicals, fish and seafood packaging, food processing, sugar mills, power generation and shipbuilding.
 Rajshahi – Rajshahi is a prominent commercial hub and industrial centre of North Bengal. For its venerable silk industry, it is nicknamed "Silk City". It has a population of more than 800,000.
 Barisal –  city in southern Bangladesh, rice and other crops producing centre of Bangladesh. Fish is also plentiful because Barisal stands on the Kirtankhola River and is surrounded by it. A Bengali saying states, Dhan, nadi, khal ai tine Barisal, which translates to "paddy, river and canal are the three things that make Barisal". It is a fast growing city, with nearly 0.38 million people and a divisional headquarters, university, medical college, engineering college, cadet college, some pharmaceutical industries, and textile industries. The city is sometimes called the "Venice of the East" or the "Venice of Bengal".
 Sylhet – city with a population of over 500,000 people that lies on the banks of Surma River in north-east Bangladesh. It is surrounded by tea estates, sub-tropical hills, rain forests and river valleys; the region is one of the leading tourist destinations in the country.
 Comilla – city in eastern Bangladesh, located along the Dhaka-Chittagong Highway, 97 kilometres from the capital city, Dhaka, which can also be reached by railway. Comilla is second-largest city of eastern Bangladesh after Chittagong and is one of the three oldest cities in Bangladesh.
 Rangpur City – 5th-largest city in Bangladesh, located in its north western part. Agricultural products such as rice, jute (called the golden fibre of Bangladesh), wheat, tobacco, and potato are the major driving power of the economy here.
 Narayanganj – city in central Bangladesh, located in the Narayanganj District, near the capital city of Dhaka. The city is on the bank of the Shitalakshya River and has a population of 220,000.  The river port of Narayanganj is one of the oldest in Bangladesh. It is also a centre of business and industry, especially the jute trade and processing plants, and of the textile sector of the country.
 Gazipur City – city in central Bangladesh with a population of over 1.1 million.
 more cities...
 List of cities and towns in Bangladesh

Villages of Bangladesh 

 Villages in Bangladesh

Demography of Bangladesh 

Demographics of Bangladesh
 1991 Bangladesh census

Government and politics of Bangladesh 

Politics of Bangladesh
 Form of government: parliamentary representative democratic republic
 Capital of Bangladesh: Dhaka
 Elections in Bangladesh
Since independence of the country, 10 Parliamentary Elections and 3 Presidential Elections were held.
There were 6 other presidential elections under Parliamentary management.
 Parliamentary Elections
 1973 Bangladeshi general election
 1979 Bangladeshi general election
 1986 Bangladeshi general election
 1988 Bangladeshi general election
 1991 Bangladeshi general election
 1996 (Feb) Bangladeshi general election
 1996 (Jun) Bangladeshi general election
 2001 Bangladeshi general election
 2008 Bangladeshi general election
 2014 Bangladeshi general election
 2018 Bangladeshi general election
 Presidential Elections
 1974 Bangladeshi presidential election
 1978 Bangladeshi presidential election
 1981 Bangladeshi presidential election
 1986 Bangladeshi presidential election
 1991 Bangladeshi presidential election
 1996 Bangladeshi presidential election
 2001 Bangladeshi presidential election
 2009 Bangladeshi presidential election
 2013 Bangladeshi presidential election
 2018 Bangladeshi presidential election
 Political parties in Bangladesh
 Taxation in Bangladesh

Branches of government

Government of Bangladesh

Executive branch of the government of Bangladesh 

 Head of state: President of Bangladesh
 Head of government: Prime Minister of Bangladesh
 Cabinet of Bangladesh

Legislative branch of the government of Bangladesh 

 Parliament of Bangladesh: Jatiyo Sangshad (unicameral)

Judicial branch of the government of Bangladesh 

Court system of Bangladesh
 Supreme Court of Bangladesh

Foreign relations of Bangladesh 

Foreign relations of Bangladesh
 Diplomatic missions in Bangladesh
 BIMSTEC
 Indo-Bangladeshi barrier
 South Asian Association for Regional Cooperation

Foreign relations with specific countries 

 Afghanistan–Bangladesh relations
 Algeria–Bangladesh relations
 Argentina–Bangladesh relations
 Australia–Bangladesh relations
 Austria–Bangladesh relations
 Azerbaijan–Bangladesh relations
 Bangladesh–Italy relations
 Bangladesh–Israel relations
 Bangladesh–Ivory Coast relations
 Bangladesh–Japan relations
 Bangladesh–Jordan relations
 Bangladesh–Kazakhstan relations
 Bangladesh–Kenya relations
 Bangladesh-Korea Technical Training Centre
 Bangladesh–Kyrgyzstan relations
 Bangladesh–Laos relations
 Bangladesh–Latvia relations
 Bangladesh–Lebanon relations
 Bangladesh–Liberia relations
 Bangladesh–Luxembourg relations
 Bangladesh–Malawi relations
 Bangladesh–Malaysia relations
 Bangladesh–Mali relations
 Bangladesh–Mauritius relations
 Bangladesh–Mexico relations
 Bangladesh–Myanmar relations
 Bangladesh–Namibia relations
 Bangladesh–Nepal relations
 Bangladesh–New Zealand relations
 Bangladesh–Nigeria relations
 Bangladesh–Pakistan relations
 Bangladesh–Panama relations
 Bangladesh–Poland relations
 Bangladesh–Portugal relations
 Bangladesh–Russia relations
 Bangladesh–Rwanda relations
 Bangladesh–Saudi Arabia relations
 Bangladesh–Serbia relations
 Bangladesh–Sierra Leone relations
 Bangladesh–Slovakia relations
 Bangladesh–South Korea relations
 Bangladesh–South Sudan relations
 Bangladesh–Spain relations
 Bangladesh–Sri Lanka relations
 Bangladesh–Sudan relations
 Bangladesh–Tajikistan relations
 Bangladesh–Thailand relations
 Bangladesh–Trinidad and Tobago relations
 Bangladesh–Turkey relations
 Bangladesh–Uganda relations
 Bangladesh–Ukraine relations
 Bangladesh–United Kingdom relations
 Bangladesh–United States relations
 Bangladesh–Venezuela relations
 Bangladesh–Yemen relations

International organisation membership 

The People's Republic of Bangladesh is a member of:

African Union/United Nations Hybrid operation in Darfur (UNAMID)
Asian Development Bank (ADB)
Association of Southeast Asian Nations Regional Forum (ARF)
Bay of Bengal Initiative for Multi-Sectoral Technical and Economic Cooperation (BIMSTEC)
Colombo Plan (CP)
Commonwealth of Nations
Food and Agriculture Organization (FAO)
Group of 77 (G77)
Member state of the Commonwealth of Nations
International Bank for Reconstruction and Development (IBRD)
International Chamber of Commerce (ICC)
International Criminal Court (ICCt) (signatory)
International Criminal Police Organization (Interpol)
International Development Association (IDA)
International Federation of Red Cross and Red Crescent Societies (IFRCS)
International Finance Corporation (IFC)
International Hydrographic Organization (IHO)
International Mobile Satellite Organization (IMSO)
International Olympic Committee (IOC)
International Organization for Migration (IOM)
International Organization for Standardization (ISO)
International Red Cross and Red Crescent Movement (ICRM)
International Telecommunications Satellite Organization (ITSO)
International Trade Union Confederation (ITUC)
Islamic Development Bank (IDB)
Multilateral Investment Guarantee Agency (MIGA)
Nonaligned Movement (NAM)
Organisation of Islamic Cooperation (OIC)
Organisation for the Prohibition of Chemical Weapons (OPCW)
South Asia Co-operative Environment Programme (SACEP)
South Asian Association for Regional Cooperation (SAARC)
World Confederation of Labour (WCL)

World Customs Organization (WCO)
World Federation of Trade Unions (WFTU)
World Trade Organization (WTO)
Member state of the United Nations
United Nations Conference on Trade and Development (UNCTAD)
United Nations Educational, Scientific, and Cultural Organization (UNESCO)
United Nations High Commissioner for Refugees (UNHCR)
United Nations Industrial Development Organization (UNIDO)
United Nations Integrated Mission in Timor-Leste (UNMIT)
United Nations Mission for the Referendum in Western Sahara (MINURSO)
United Nations Mission in Liberia (UNMIL)
United Nations Mission in the Central African Republic and Chad (MINURCAT)
United Nations Mission in the Sudan (UNMIS)
United Nations Observer Mission in Georgia (UNOMIG)
United Nations Operation in Cote d'Ivoire (UNOCI)
United Nations Organization Mission in the Democratic Republic of the Congo (MONUC)
International Atomic Energy Agency (IAEA)
International Civil Aviation Organization (ICAO)
International Fund for Agricultural Development (IFAD)
International Labour Organization (ILO)
International Maritime Organization (IMO)
International Monetary Fund (IMF)
International Telecommunication Union (ITU)
Universal Postal Union (UPU)
World Health Organization (WHO)
World Intellectual Property Organization (WIPO)
World Meteorological Organization (WMO)
World Tourism Organization (UNWTO)

Law and order in Bangladesh 

Law of Bangladesh
 Crime in Bangladesh
 Human trafficking in Bangladesh
 Corruption in Bangladesh
 Persecution of Biharis in Bangladesh
 Suicide in Bangladesh
 Human rights in Bangladesh
 Abortion in Bangladesh
 Child labour in Bangladesh
 Gender inequality in Bangladesh
 BRAC (NGO)
 LGBT rights in Bangladesh
 LGBT history in Bangladesh
 Freedom of religion in Bangladesh
 Polygamy in Bangladesh
 Law enforcement in Bangladesh
 Bangladesh Police
 Bangladesh Ansar
 Rapid Action Battalion
 Laws of Bangladesh
 Constitution of Bangladesh
 Blasphemy law in Bangladesh
 Capital punishment in Bangladesh
 Indemnity Act
 Vested Property Act (Bangladesh)
 Ministry of Home Affairs

Military of Bangladesh 

Military of Bangladesh
 Command
 Commander-in-chief: President of Bangladesh
 Ministry of Defence of Bangladesh
 Forces
 Army of Bangladesh
 Bangladesh Infantry Regiment
 East Bengal Regiment
 Bangladesh Military Academy
 Border Guard Bangladesh
 Navy of Bangladesh
 Air Force of Bangladesh
 Rapid Action Battalion
 Military bases
 Dhaka Cantonment
 Bogra Cantonment
 Military history of Bangladesh

Local government in Bangladesh 

Local government in Bangladesh

History of Bangladesh 

History of Bangladesh
 History of Bangladesh
 Timeline of Bangladeshi history
 History of Bengal – geographical and ethno-linguistic region in South Asia. was politically divided in the 1947 Partition of Bengal based on religion: predominantly Hindu West Bengal became a province (now a state) of India, and predominantly Muslim East Bengal (now Bangladesh) became a province of Pakistan.

History of Bangladesh, by period 

 Ancient Period
 Vanga Kingdom
 Gangaridai
 Middle Ages
 Pala Empire
 Sena Empire
 Islamic Rule
 Delhi Sultanate
 Bengal Sultanate
 Sur dynasty
 Mughals Rule
 Mughal Empire
 European Rule
 British Rule
 Battle of Plassey
 Permanent Settlement
 Dhaka Nawab Family
 Anushilan Samiti
 Partition of Bengal (1905)
 East Bengal
 Chittagong armoury raid
 Pakistani Rule
 Partition of Bengal (1947)
 East Bengal
 Bengali Language Movement 
 Modern history
 Liberation War period
 1971 Bangladesh atrocities
 Agartala Conspiracy Case
 Al-Badr (East Pakistan)
 Al-Shams
 Archer Blood
 Bangladesh Liberation War
 Battle of Garibpur
 Battle of Hilli
 Chorompotro
 Chuknagar massacre
 The Concert for Bangladesh
 East Pakistan
 Ekattorer Dingulee
 Hemayet Bahini
 Indo-Pakistani War of 1971
 Instrument of Surrender (1971)
 Jinjira genocide
 Kader Bahini
 List of books on Liberation War of Bangladesh
 Martyred intellectual
 Mitro Bahini
 M. R. Akhtar Mukul
 Mukti Bahini
 Razakar
 Recipients of Bangladeshi military awards in 1971
 Shanti Committee
 Six point movement
 Swadhin Bangla Betar Kendra
 1970 on
 Bangladesh famine of 1974
 Assassination of Sheikh Mujibur Rahman
 Assassination of Ziaur Rahman

Years in Bangladesh 

1971 - 1972 - 1973 - 1974 - 1975 - 1976 - 1977 - 1978 - 1979 - 1980 - 1981 - 1982 - 1983 - 1984 - 1985 - 1986 - 1987 - 1988 - 1989 - 1990 - 1991 - 1992 - 1993 - 1994 - 1995 - 1996 - 1997 - 1998 - 1999 - 2000 - 2001 - 2002 - 2003 - 2004 - 2005 - 2006 - 2007 - 2008 - 2009 - 2010 - 2011 - 2012 - 2013 - 2014 - 2015 - 2016 - 2017 - 2018 - 2019 - 2020 - 2021

History of Bangladesh, by region 
 History of Dhaka
 History of Chittagong
 History of Rajshahi
 History of Khulna
 History of Barisal
 History of Sylhet
 History of Comilla
 History of Rangpur City
 History of Narayanganj
 History of Gazipur

History of Bangladesh, by subject 

 History of aviation in Bangladesh
 History of banking in Bangladesh
 LGBT history in Bangladesh
 Military history of Bangladesh
 Military coups in Bangladesh
 Political history of Bangladesh
 2006–2008 Bangladeshi political crisis

Culture of Bangladesh 

 Architecture of Bangladesh
 Architecture of Bengal
 Buildings in Bangladesh
 Jatiyo Sangshad Bhaban
 Ahsan Manzil
 Dhaka Central Jail
 Hoseni Dalan
 Curzon Hall
 Lalbagh Fort
 Taj Mahal Bangladesh
 Bangabandhu Sheikh Mujibur Rahman Novo Theatre
 Monuments in Bangladesh
 Jatiyo Smriti Soudho
 Martyred Intellectuals Memorial
 Shaheed Minar
 Clothing of Bangladesh
 Dhakai
 Jamdani
 Lungi
 Rajshahi silk
 Saree
 Cuisine of Bangladesh
 Hilsa
 Jackfruit
 Festivals in Bangladesh
 Poush Sangkranti
 Languages of Bangladesh
 Bengali language
 Bishnupriya Manipuri language
 Chittagonian language
 Manipuri language
 Sylheti language
 Museums in Bangladesh
 Bangladesh National Museum
 Varendra Research Museum
 Ethnological Museum of Chittagong
 National symbols of Bangladesh
 Coat of arms of Bangladesh
 Flag of Bangladesh
 National anthem of Bangladesh
 Prostitution in Bangladesh
 Public holidays in Bangladesh
 List of museums in Bangladesh
 Bangladesh Scouts
 Video gaming in Bangladesh
 List of World Heritage Sites in Bangladesh

Art in Bangladesh 
Art in Bangladesh
 Cinema of Bangladesh
 Theatre in Bangladesh

Literature of Bangladesh 
 Bengali literature

Folklore of Bangladesh
 Behula
 Maimansingha Gitika
 Puthi

Historical Books
 Charyapada
 Bangladesh: A Legacy of Blood
 Banker to the Poor

Novels
Bengali novels
 General fiction
 Bishad Shindhu
 Lajja
 Pak Sar Jamin Sad Bad
 Sultana's Dream
 Bengali science fiction

Poems
Bengali poetry
 Banalata Sen
 Chharpatra
 Nolok

Little Magazines

Music of Bangladesh 

 Music of Bangladesh
 Musical genres
 Baul
 Bhawaiya
 Bhatiali
 Gombhira
 Musical instruments
 Dhol
 Dotara
 Ektara
 Tabla

Sculptures in Bangladesh 
 Aparajeyo Bangla
 Shabash Bangladesh
 Shapla Square

Media in Bangladesh 
 Television in Bangladesh

Newspapers in Bangladesh 
Newspapers in Bangladesh
 Local newspapers in Bangladesh
 The Daily Ittefaq
 Prothom Alo
 Kishore Bangla
 The Daily Sangram
 Suprobhat Bangladesh
 The Independent (Bangladesh)
 The Daily Star
 Dhaka Tribune

Television in Bangladesh 
 List of Bangladeshi television and radio channels
 List of television stations in Bangladesh

Television channels in Bangladesh 
 ATN Bangla
 Bangladesh Television |  | Channel One (Bangladesh)
 Channel S
 Ekushey Television
 NTV (Bangladesh)
 RTV

Television programmes in Bangladesh 
 Bohubrihi
 Ittadi
 Jodi Kichhu Mone Na Koren
 Mati O Manush
 Songsoptok
 Shomoyer Kotha

Radio in Bangladesh 
 Bangladesh Betar
 ABC Radio
 Radio Amar
 Radio Today
 Radio Foorti
 Radio Metrowave

People of Bangladesh 

People of Bangladesh
 Ethnic groups in Bangladesh
 Indigenous peoples in Bangladesh
 Bom people
 Bengali people
 Biharis in Bangladesh
 Chakma people
 Garo people
 Kuki people
 Marma people
 Zo people
 Diaspora in Bangladesh
 Armenians in Bangladesh
 Chinese people in Bangladesh
 Indians in Bangladesh
 Other groups
 LGBT history in Bangladesh
 Street children in Bangladesh
 Women in Bangladesh

Religion and beliefs in Bangladesh 
 Religion in Bangladesh
 Bahá'í Faith in Bangladesh
 Buddhism in Bangladesh
 Christianity in Bangladesh
 Christian Commission for Development in Bangladesh
 Protestantism in Bangladesh
 Roman Catholicism in Bangladesh
 Cathedrals in Bangladesh
 Roman Catholic dioceses in Bangladesh
 Hinduism in Bangladesh
 Hindu temples in Bangladesh
 Islam in Bangladesh
 Ahmadiyya in Bangladesh
 Bishwa Ijtema
 Irreligion in Bangladesh
 Secularism in Bangladesh

Mosques 
 Baitul Mukarram
 Binat Bibi Mosque
 Sixty Dome Mosque
 Star Mosque

Temples, churches and pagodas 
 Church of Bangladesh
 Dhakeshwari Temple
 Kantajew Temple
 Ramna Kali Mandir
 Somapura Mahavihara
 Temple of King Kangsa Narayan

Mausoleums
 Shah Jalal

Sports in Bangladesh 

Sports in Bangladesh
 Football in Bangladesh
 Bangladesh national football team
 Bangladesh Professional Football League
 Football venues
 Bangabandhu National Stadium
 Bangladesh at the Olympics
 Stadiums in Bangladesh

 Bangladesh Davis Cup team
 Bangladeshi kabaddi team
 Abahani Krira Chakra
 Brothers Union
 Mohammedan Sporting Club (Dhaka)
 Muktijoddha
 Bangladesh at the 2006 Commonwealth Games

Cricket in Bangladesh 
Cricket in Bangladesh

 Cricket teams in Bangladesh
 Bangladesh national cricket team
 Bangladesh National Cricket Team Statistics and Records
 Bangladesh national women's cricket team
 Bangladeshi U-19 cricket team
 Bangladesh A cricket team
 Bangladesh A cricket team in England in 2005
 Bangladesh Under-19 cricket team
 Central Zone cricket team (Bangladesh)
 East Zone cricket team (Bangladesh)
 North Zone cricket team (Bangladesh)
 South Zone cricket team (Bangladesh)
 Bangladesh Cricket Board
 Cricket leagues in Bangladesh
 National Cricket League (Bangladesh)
 Bangladesh NCL (National Cricket League) Twenty20
 Bangladesh NCL (National Cricket League) Twenty20 Tournament 2010
 Cricket players in Bangladesh
 List of Bangladesh ODI cricketers
 List of Bangladesh Test cricketers
 List of Bangladesh cricketers who have taken five-wicket hauls on Test debut
 List of Bangladesh Twenty20 International cricketers
 List of Bangladesh national cricket captains
 Cricket venues in Bangladesh
 Cricket grounds in Bangladesh
 Sher-e-Bangla Cricket Stadium
 Chittagong Divisional Stadium
 Fatullah Osmani Stadium
 Shaheed Chandu Stadium
 Biman Bangladesh Airlines cricket team

History of cricket in Bangladesh 
History of cricket in Bangladesh
 Bangladesh Women's cricket team in India in 2012–13
 By season
 2000–01 Bangladeshi cricket season
 2001–02 Bangladeshi cricket season
 2002–03 Bangladeshi cricket season
 2003–04 Bangladeshi cricket season
 2004–05 Bangladeshi cricket season
 2005–06 Bangladeshi cricket season
 2006–07 Bangladeshi cricket season
 2007–08 Bangladeshi cricket season
 2008–09 Bangladeshi cricket season
 2012–13 Bangladeshi cricket season
 2013–14 Bangladeshi cricket season
 Away from home
 Bangladesh cricket team in Australia in 2003
 Bangladesh cricket team in Australia in 2008
 Bangladeshi cricket team in England in 2005
 Bangladeshi cricket team in England in 2010
 Bangladeshi cricket team in Ireland and Netherlands in 2012
 Bangladeshi cricket team in Ireland in 2010
 Bangladeshi cricket team in Kenya in 1983–84
 Bangladeshi cricket team in Kenya in 2006
 Bangladeshi cricket team in New Zealand in 1997–98
 Bangladeshi cricket team in New Zealand in 2001–02
 Bangladeshi cricket team in New Zealand in 2007–08
 Bangladeshi cricket team in New Zealand in 2009–10
 Bangladeshi cricket team in Pakistan in 1986
 Bangladeshi cricket team in Pakistan in 2001–02
 Bangladeshi cricket team in Pakistan in 2003
 Bangladeshi cricket team in Pakistan in 2003–04
 Bangladeshi cricket team in Pakistan in 2007–08
 Bangladeshi cricket team in Pakistan in 2008
 Bangladeshi cricket team in Scotland in 2010
 Bangladeshi cricket team in South Africa in 2008–09
 Bangladeshi cricket team in Sri Lanka in 1985–86
 Bangladeshi cricket team in Sri Lanka in 2002
 Bangladeshi cricket team in Sri Lanka in 2005–06
 Bangladeshi cricket team in Sri Lanka in 2007
 Bangladeshi cricket team in Sri Lanka in 2012–13
 Bangladeshi cricket team in the West Indies in 2004
 Bangladeshi cricket team in the West Indies in 2009
 Bangladeshi cricket team in the West Indies in 2014
 Bangladeshi cricket team in West Bengal in 1983–84
 Bangladeshi cricket team in Zimbabwe in 2000–01
 Bangladeshi cricket team in Zimbabwe in 2003–04
 Bangladeshi cricket team in Zimbabwe in 2006
 Bangladeshi cricket team in Zimbabwe in 2006–07
 Bangladeshi cricket team in Zimbabwe in 2009
 Bangladeshi cricket team in Zimbabwe in 2011
 Bangladeshi cricket team in Zimbabwe in 2013
 Visiting teams
 Australian cricket team in Bangladesh in 2005–06
 Australian cricket team in Bangladesh in 2011
 Danish XI cricket team in Bangladesh in 1989–90
 England A cricket team in Bangladesh in 1994–95
 England A cricket team in Bangladesh in 1999–2000
 English cricket team in Bangladesh in 2003–04
 English cricket team in Bangladesh in 2009–10
 Indian cricket team in Bangladesh in 2000–01
 Indian cricket team in Bangladesh in 2004–05
 Indian cricket team in Bangladesh in 2007
 Indian cricket team in Bangladesh in 2009–10
 Indian cricket team in Bangladesh in 2014
 Irish cricket team in Bangladesh in 2007–08
 Karachi Airlines Gymkhana cricket team in Bangladesh in 1992–93
 Kenyan cricket team in Bangladesh in 2005–06
 Marylebone Cricket Club cricket team in Bangladesh in 1976–77
 Marylebone Cricket Club cricket team in Bangladesh in 1980–81
 Marylebone Cricket Club cricket team in Bangladesh in 1999–2000
 New Zealand cricket team in Bangladesh in 2004–05
 New Zealand cricket team in Bangladesh in 2008–09
 New Zealand cricket team in Bangladesh in 2010–11
 New Zealand cricket team in Bangladesh in 2013–14
 Pakistani cricket team in Bangladesh in 1979–80
 Pakistani cricket team in Bangladesh in 2001–02
 Pakistani cricket team in Bangladesh in 2011–12
 Scottish cricket team in Bangladesh in 2006–07
 South African cricket team in Bangladesh in 2003
 South African cricket team in Bangladesh in 2007–08
 Sri Lankan cricket team in Bangladesh in 1977–78
 Sri Lankan cricket team in Bangladesh in 1984–85
 Sri Lankan cricket team in Bangladesh in 2005–06
 Sri Lankan cricket team in Bangladesh in 2008–09
 Sri Lankan cricket team in Bangladesh in 2013–14
 West Bengal cricket team in Bangladesh in 1982–83
 West Indian cricket team in Bangladesh in 1999–2000
 West Indian cricket team in Bangladesh in 2002–03
 West Indian cricket team in Bangladesh in 2011–12
 West Indian cricket team in Bangladesh in 2012–13

Economy and infrastructure of Bangladesh 

Economy of Bangladesh
 Economic rank, by nominal GDP (2007): 58th (fifty-eighth)
 Agriculture in Bangladesh
 Jute trade
 Fishing in Bangladesh
 Forestry in Bangladesh
 Rice production in Bangladesh
 Banking in Bangladesh
 History of banking in Bangladesh
 Banks in Bangladesh
 National Bank of Bangladesh
 Ceramics industry in Bangladesh
 Construction industry in Bangladesh
 Green building in Bangladesh
 Electronics industry in Bangladesh
 Information technology in Bangladesh
 Companies of Bangladesh
 Currency of Bangladesh: Taka
ISO 4217: BDT
 Paisa
 Bangladesh Export Processing Zone Authority
 Food industry in Bangladesh
 Pharmaceutical industry in Bangladesh
 Poverty in Bangladesh
 Street children in Bangladesh
 Real estate in Bangladesh
 Retail industry in Bangladesh
 Online shopping in Bangladesh
 Science and technology in Bangladesh
 Steel industry in Bangladesh
 Stock exchanges in Bangladesh
 Chittagong Stock Exchange
 Dhaka Stock Exchange
 Textile industry in Bangladesh
 Tourism in Bangladesh
 Water supply and sanitation in Bangladesh
 Waste management in Bangladesh

Communications in Bangladesh 

 Postal system in Bangladesh

Telecommunications in Bangladesh 

Telecommunications in Bangladesh
 Internet in Bangladesh
 .bd
 .বাংলা
 Bangladesh Telecommunication Regulatory Commission
 Grameen Telecom
 Telecom System in Bangladesh
 Phone service in Bangladesh
 Telephone numbers in Bangladesh
 Phone companies
 Landphone companies
 Bangladesh Telegraph and Telephone Board
 OneTel
 Mobile phone companies
 TeleTalk
 Grameenphone
 Banglalink
 Robi
 Airtel
 Citycell

Energy in Bangladesh 

Energy in Bangladesh
 Electricity sector in Bangladesh
 Power stations in Bangladesh
 Energy policy of Bangladesh
 Natural gas in Bangladesh
 Nuclear energy in Bangladesh

Transport in Bangladesh 
Transport in Bangladesh
 Country boats in Bangladesh
 Vehicular transport in Bangladesh
 Automotive industry in Bangladesh
 Driving license in Bangladesh
 Road system in Bangladesh
 Bridges in Bangladesh
 Hardinge Bridge
 Jamuna Bridge
 Lalon Shah Bridge
 Roads in Bangladesh
 Highways in Bangladesh
 Rail transport in Bangladesh

Air transport in Bangladesh 

 History of aviation in Bangladesh

Airports in Bangladesh 

Airports in Bangladesh
 Shahjalal International Airport
 Tejgaon Airport
 Shah Amanat International Airport
 Osmani International Airport
 Ishurdi Airport
 Saidpur Airport
 Jessore Airport
 Cox's Bazar Airport
 Shah Makhdum Airport
 Barisal Airport

Marine transport in Bangladesh 

 Shipbuilding in Bangladesh

Seaports in Bangladesh 
 Port of Chittagong
 Port of Mongla
 Port of Paira

Education in Bangladesh 

Education in Bangladesh
 Academic grading in Bangladesh
 University Grants Commission (Bangladesh)

Schools in Bangladesh 
 List of schools in Bangladesh
 Aga Khan School, Dhaka
 Azimpur Girls' High School
 Bangladesh Air Force Shaheen College
 Bangladesh International School and College
 Biroidakuni High School
 Blue Bird High School and College
 Bogra Zilla School 
 Brother Andre High School (Noakhali)
 Chittagong Collegiate School and College
 Chittagong Government High School
 Daulatpur Mohsin High School
 Dawood Public School
 Dhaka Collegiate School
 Dhaka Residential Model College
 Dhanmondi Government Boys' High School
 Dhanmondi Tutorial
 Dr. Khastagir Government Girls' School
 Government Laboratory High School
 Holy Cross Girls' High School (Dhaka)
 Holy Cross High School (Bandura)
 Ideal School and College
 Jalalabad Cantonment Public School and College
 Jessore Zilla School
 Maple Leaf International School
 Madhupur Rani Bhabani Model High School
 Madhupur Shahid Smrity Higher Secondary School
 Masjid Mission Academy
 Mastermind School
 Miriam Ashram High School
 Monipur High School
 Motijheel Model High School and College
 Pogose School 
 Rajshahi Collegiate School
 Rangpur Zilla School
 Saint Joseph Higher Secondary School (Dhaka)
 Saint Joseph School of Industrial Trades (Dhaka)
 Saint Nicholas High School
 Scholars' School and College
 Scholastica School
 Sherpur Government Victoria Academy
 St Gregory's School (Dhaka)
 Sunbeams School
 Udayan Higher Secondary School
 Viqarunnisa Noon School and College
 Willes Little Flower School

Colleges in Bangladesh 

 Architecture schools in Bangladesh
 Business schools in Bangladesh
 Dental schools in Bangladesh
 General colleges
 Madhupur Shahid Smrity Higher Secondary School
 Madhupur College
 Abdul Kadir Mollah City College
 B A F Shaheen College
 Brajalal College
 Brojomohun College
 Chittagong College
 Dhaka City College
 Dhaka College
 Dhaka Residential Model College
 Murari Chand College
 SOS Hermann Gmeiner College
 Notre Dame College (Dhaka)
 Rajshahi College
 Eden Girls' College
 Government Hazi Mohammad Mohshin College
 Government Saadat College
 Notre Dame College, Dhaka
 Carmichael College
 Savar Model College
 Jalalabad Cantonment Public School & College
 Sherpur Government College
 Agricultural University College

Cadet Colleges in Bangladesh 
 Barisal Cadet College
 Comilla Cadet College
 Faujdarhat Cadet College
 Feni Girls Cadet College
 Jhenaidah Cadet College
 Joypurhat Girls Cadet College
 Mymensingh Girls Cadet College
 Mirzapur Cadet College
 Pabna Cadet College
 Rajshahi Cadet College
 Rangpur Cadet College
 Sylhet Cadet College |

Medical colleges in Bangladesh 
 Chittagong Medical College
 Comilla Medical College
 Dhaka Medical College and Hospital
 Dinajpur Medical College
 Mymensingh Medical College
 Rajshahi Medical College
 Rangpur Medical College
 Sir Salimullah Medical College
 M.A.G. Osmani Medical College, Sylhet
 Faridpur Medical College
 more...

Universities in Bangladesh 

Universities in Bangladesh
 University of Dhaka
 Chittagong University
 Rajshahi University
 Jahangirnagar University
 Bangladesh University of Engineering and Technology
 Bangladesh University of Textiles
 National University
 Dhaka University of Engineering and Technology
 Shanto Mariam University of Creative Technology
 American International University-Bangladesh
 East West University
 ASA University Bangladesh
 International Islamic University, Chittagong
 BRAC University
 Chittagong University of Engineering & Technology
 Hajee Mohammad Danesh Science and Technology University
 Islamic University of Technology
 Jatiya Kabi Kazi Nazrul Islam University
 Khulna University
 Khulna University of Engineering and Technology
 Mawlana Bhashani Science and Technology University
 Noakhali Science and Technology University
 North South University
 Patuakhali Science and Technology University
 Rajshahi University of Engineering and Technology
 Shahjalal University of Science and Technology
 University of Asia Pacific (Bangladesh)
 Ahsanullah University of Science and Technology
 Bangabandhu Sheikh Mujib Medical University
 University of Science & Technology Chittagong
 Asian University of Bangladesh
 Primeasia University
 Daffodil International University
 University of Development Alternative
 more...

Madrassahs in Bangladesh 
 Quomi
 Al-Markazul Islami As-Salafi
 Hazari Gonj Hamidia Fazil Madrasah
 Paschim Jinnahgarh Nuria Alim Madrasah

Health in Bangladesh 

Health in Bangladesh
 Abortion in Bangladesh
 Biotechnology and genetic engineering in Bangladesh
 Blood donation in Bangladesh
 HIV/AIDS in Bangladesh
 Hospitals in Bangladesh
 Pharmaceutical industry in Bangladesh
 Suicide in Bangladesh

See also

Outline of Asia
Outline of geography
 Accord on Fire and Building Safety in Bangladesh
 Accounting in Bangladesh
 Architecture school in Bangladesh
 Cadet Colleges in Bangladesh
 Climate change in Bangladesh
 Daylight saving time in Bangladesh
 Floods in Bangladesh
 Rugby union in Bangladesh
 Scouting and Guiding in Bangladesh
 Nepalis in Bangladesh
 Rickshaw art in Bangladesh
 Shakrain Festival in Bangladesh
 Textile schools in Bangladesh
 Tri-Series in Bangladesh in 2008–09
 Tri-Series in Bangladesh in 2009–10
 Tri-nation series in Bangladesh in 2008
 Worldwide Protests for Free Expression in Bangladesh
 List of parliamentary constituencies of Bangladesh
 List of Qawmi Madrasas in Bangladesh

 Conglomerates in Bangladesh
 Endangered languages in Bangladesh
 Festivals in Bangladesh
 List of fishes in Bangladesh
 Football clubs in Bangladesh
 Hartal in Bangladesh
 Hotels in Bangladesh
 Institutes in Bangladesh
 Journalists killed in Bangladesh
 Libraries in Bangladesh
 Massacres in Bangladesh
 Mosques in Bangladesh
 List of places in Bangladesh named Baghmara
 Postal codes in Bangladesh
 List of sectors in Bangladesh Liberation War
 Shopping malls in Bangladesh
 Slums in Bangladesh
 Tallest buildings in Bangladesh
 Zoos in Bangladesh
 Rohingya refugees in Bangladesh
 Bengali Muslims

Miscellaneous
 Padamdi Nawab Estate
 Bangladesh Standard Time

General culture
 Eid al-Adha
 Eid ul-Fitr
 Laylat al-Qadr
 Durga Puja
 Pohela Boishakh
 Nobanno

References

External links

Official
 
 
 
 
 
 
 

Others
 
 
 
 
 
 
 

 Bangladesh. The World Factbook. Central Intelligence Agency.

Bangladesh
Bangladesh